The Plain Red Banner was one of the Eight Banners (lower five Banners) of Manchu military and society organization during the Later Jin and Qing dynasty of China. Famous members included:

 Daišan
 Wenxiang
 Heshen, Clan Niohuru, considered one of the most corrupt officials in history
 Zheng Keshuang (Han Bannerman, 八旗汉军)
 Lao She

Notable clans 

 Fuca clan
 Gūwalgiya
 Niohuru
 Hešeri
 Donggo
 Wuqigeli
 Ning
 Li
 Zheng

 
Plain Red Banner
Plain Red Bannermen